Adana Metropolitan Theatre is a theatre hall in the Reşatbey neighborhood of the city of Adana. It is the oldest living theatre hall of the city, and currently the most active; hosting numerous theatre performances, concerts and conferences.

History
The theatre was built in 1938, as a community centre (()). It was converted into City Hall in 1951, after the law introduced by the national government that shut down all the community centres in Turkey. Adana Town Theatre was founded in 1958, performed its first play 'An American in Harput' on October 15, 1958. Çukurova State Symphony Orchestra conducted its first concert at the hall in 1992.

The Hall
525-seater theatre hall is the permanent home of the Çukurova State Symphony Orchestra and Adana Town Theatre. Symphony Orchestra conducts concerts every Friday, from October to May at the hall. Town theatre stage twice weekly. Several private theatres, concert groups also performs all year long at the theatre hall.

References

Theatres in Adana
Buildings and structures in Adana